Agrochola nitida is a moth of the family Noctuidae. It is found in most of Europe, except Great Britain, Ireland, and the Iberian Peninsula.

The wingspan is about 30–38 mm. Adults are on wing from mid August to October. There is one generation per year.

The larvae feed on Galium, Plantago, Primula, Rumex, and Veronica species.

References

External links 

Fauna Europaea
Lepiforum.de
GBIF

Agrochola
Moths of Europe
Moths described in 1775
Taxa named by Michael Denis
Taxa named by Ignaz Schiffermüller